Ruhi Sarı (born 18 May 1972) is a Turkish actor. He is best known for hit series "Yeditepe İstanbul", "Yarım Elma", "Sultan Makamı". He has appeared in more than ninety films and series.

Selected filmography

References

External links 

1972 births
Living people
Turkish male film actors